Kadhal Kisu Kisu is a 2003 Indian Tamil-language action comedy film directed by P. Vasu. The film stars Bala and Charmy Kaur, while Manivannan, Kalabhavan Mani and Vivek play supporting roles. The film produced by Kesavan, had music scored by Vidyasagar. The film released in 2003 to below average collections and reviews.

Plot 

Sriram (Bala) is the only son of Manivannan and Meera Krishnan who is very fond of his parents. The family is settled in Malaysia and Sriram studies in a college. Indu (Charmy Kaur) is the daughter of a rich businessman Karunakaran (Kalabhavan Mani) and she is Sriram's classmate. Karunakaran is short tempered and never trusts his own daughter. He always fears that Indu would fall in love with someone which makes him to behave strict towards her always.

One day, Indu's classmates plan to throw a surprise birthday party to her. But Karunakaran arrives during the time of the party which shocks Indu. Also, one of her classmate fouls plays by sending a gift in the name of Sriram to Indu which is seen by Karunakaran. Now Karunakaran doubts that Indu is in love with Sriram but Indu refuses that which Karunakaran does not believe. Karunakaran plans to get Indu married to a rich guy. But Indu gets to know that the groom is a murderer and shows no interest in the wedding proposal which further angers Karunakaran.

A few other incidents happen by coincidence which makes Karunakaran believe that Indu and Sriram are in love. Karunakaran threatens Sriram's father Manivannan asking him to control his son. When Manivannan enquires about this, Sriram promises that he does not love anyone and he would marry only the girl selected by his parents. But Karunakaran's doubts still persist and he beats Maniannan's shop one day. Manivannan gets frightened and requests Sriram to leave the town for a few days so that Karunakaran does not harm Sriram.

Sriram agrees and decides to move to a nearby town. To his surprise, Indu also boards the same bus in which Sriram is travelling. Indu has decided to run away from her home as she could not bear her father's torture. Now Karunakaran again misunderstands that Sriram and Indu have eloped together and chases them.

Sriram and Indu get down from the bus to safeguard their lives and run towards to a forest. They stay for a few days in the forest as they didn't know the way to get out from there. Finally, Sriram and Indu manage to return. In the meantime, Karunakaran has lodged a complaint that Indu was kidnapped by Sriram. The couple reaches the court and reveals that no one was kidnapped and they also make it clear that they are not in love and all the happenings are mere coincidence.

Finally, Karunakaran realizes his mistake and understands the Sriram's good intention of only marrying a girl selected by his parents and also feels bad about his rude behaviour towards his daughter. He also expresses interest to get Indu married to Sriram as he will not be able to find a better match than him. The movie ends with both Indu and Sriram getting united.

Cast

Soundtrack
Soundtrack was composed by Vidyasagar.

Release
The Hindu gave the film a below-average review, noting "it is not that the director does not have a message for the viewer. He does, but the faulty approach to the theme takes the film far away from the mark." Thiraipadam wrote "The one-line story is definitely difficult to translate to a two and a half hour movie. With the only things happening being a series of incidents where Bala and Sharmi are inadvertently caught together, P. Vasu's only option was to provide interesting characters and create an interesting scenario for the results of the suspicions on the couple. He unfortunately fails on both fronts". Chennai Online wrote "The knot had the potential, but with the director depending on a whole series of co-incidences to carry forward his story, there's not much surprise or exciting viewing for the audience".

References

External links

2003 films
2003 action comedy films
Indian action comedy films
2000s Tamil-language films
Films directed by P. Vasu
Films scored by Vidyasagar